The 2014 Football Federation Victoria season was the first season under the new competition format for state-level football (soccer) in Victoria.  The competition consists of seven divisions across the state of Victoria.

League Tables

2014 National Premier Leagues Victoria

The 2014 National Premier Leagues Victoria season was played over 26 rounds, from March to September 2014.  The overall premier of this division qualified for the 2014 National Premier Leagues finals series, competing with the other state federation champions in a final knockout tournament to decide the National Premier Leagues champion for 2014.

2014 National Premier Leagues Victoria 1

The 2014 National Premier Leagues Victoria 1 was played over 26 rounds, beginning on 14 March and concluding on 28 September 2014.  The top two teams at the end of the season were promoted to National Premier Leagues Victoria. No teams were relegated as the league is set to expand to 20 teams and two parallel divisions for the next season.

2014 Victoria State League 1

North-West

South-East

2014 Victoria State League 2

North-West

South-East

2014 Victoria State League 3

North-West

South-East

Promotion play-off

2014 Victoria State League 4

North

West

South

East

2014 Victoria State League 5

North

West

South

East

2014 Women's Premier League

Finals

Cup Competitions

2014 Dockerty Cup

Football Victoria soccer clubs competed in 2014 for the Dockerty Cup. The tournament doubled as the Victorian Qualifying rounds for the 2014 FFA Cup, with the top four clubs progressing to the Round of 32. A total of 191 clubs entered the qualifying phase, with the clubs entering in a staggered format.

The Cup was won by Melbourne Knights.

In addition to the two A-League clubs (Melbourne Victory and Melbourne City), the four semi-finalists (Bentleigh Greens, Melbourne Knights, St Albans Saints and South Springvale) competed in the final rounds of the 2014 FFA Cup.

References

2014 in Australian soccer
Soccer in Victoria (Australia)